The ABEC scale is an industry accepted standard for the tolerances of a ball bearing. It was developed by the Annular Bearing Engineering Committee (ABEC) of the American Bearing Manufacturers Association (ABMA). The ABEC scale is designed to provide bearing manufacturers dimensional specifications that meet the standards of precision bearings in a specified class. Manufacturers who produce equipment that require bearings must also know the dimensional tolerances to design parts that will accommodate a bearing.

There are five classes from largest to smallest tolerances: 1, 3, 5, 7, 9. The higher ABEC classes provide better precision, efficiency, and the possibility of greater speed capabilities, but do not necessarily allow the components to spin faster. The ABEC rating does not specify many critical factors, such as load handling capabilities, ball precision, materials, material Rockwell hardness, degree of ball and raceway polishing, noise, vibration, and lubricant. Due to these factors, an ABEC 3 classified bearing could perform better than an ABEC 7 bearing. Bearings not conforming to at least ABEC 1 cannot be classified as precision bearings because their tolerances are too loose.

The scale also works as a guide for consumers to make informed decisions about the type of bearing they desire, despite not knowing factors related to materials, manufacturing, and performance.

High rated bearings are intended for precision applications such as aircraft instruments or surgical equipment. Lower graded bearings are intended for the vast majority of applications such as vehicles, mechanical hobbies, roller skates, skateboards, fishing reels and industrial machinery. High ABEC rated bearings allow optimal performance of critical applications requiring very high revolutions per minute and smooth operation.

The ISO (International Organization for Standardization) equivalent standard is ISO 492.   The German equivalent is DIN 620. The Japanese equivalent is JIS B1514.

Bearing Tolerance Illustrated

For illustration, the figure shows the differences in tolerance per ABEC class in µm for a 20 mm inner diameter bearing. A 20 mm ABEC 7 bearing only has a 5 μm tolerance window, whereas an ABEC 1 has twice as wide a tolerance.

References

Bearings (mechanical)